The following is a list of schools in North Central Province, Sri Lanka.

Anuradhapura District

National schools

Provincial schools

Private schools

International schools

Special Schools

Polonnaruwa District

National schools

Provincial schools

International schools

External links
 North Central Provincial Department of Education 
 Department of Census and Statistics-School Census Report 2020

 
North Central Province